This is an article introducing the board of directors of the Iranian parliament and legislative system of the Islamic Republic of Iran called the Islamic Consultative Assembly.

The Board of Directors of the Islamic Consultative Assembly is elected by direct vote of the members of the Islamic Consultative Assembly for a term of one year, and according to the internal regulations of the Islamic Consultative Assembly, the repetition of members of the Board of Directors of the Assembly is not prohibited by law. The Board of Directors of the Islamic Consultative Assembly consists of a chairman, two vice-chairmen, six secretaries and three observers. The chairman is elected by an absolute majority of the votes of the representatives and the other members of the board are elected separately and by a relative majority.

The Speaker is also the Chairman of the Board. The speaker of the parliament is in charge of running the parliament, and if he is not present at the meeting, the first and second vice-chairmen are in charge of this position, respectively.

Current Board of Directors 
The current Board of Directors of the Islamic Consultative Assembly is as follows:

Board of Directors by age 
According to the internal regulations of the Islamic Consultative Assembly, a temporary Board of Directors by age consisting of the oldest and youngest members will chair the meetings until the board is elected. This board is responsible for the inauguration ceremony.

See also 
 The history of the parliament in Iran
 National Democratic Front (Iran)
 Comrades Party
 List of grand viziers of Persia
 Women in the Parliament of Iran

References

Islamic Consultative Assembly